Salma validalis is a species of moth of the family Pyralidae. It is found in India, Sri Lanka, Borneo and Taiwan.

References

Moths described in 1866
Epipaschiinae